Lelchuk,  is a surname. Notable people with the surname include: 

Alan Lelchuk, American novelist, academic, and editor
V. S. Lelchuk (born 1929), Russian historian
Zoya Schleining (née Lelchuk, born 1961), German chess player

Jewish surnames